Gordon Clapp (born September 24, 1948) is an American actor best known for playing Det. Greg Medavoy for all 12 seasons of the television series NYPD Blue, winning an Emmy Award in 1998.

Early life and education
Clapp was born in North Conway, New Hampshire. He graduated from Williams College in 1971. At Williams College, he met frequent collaborators David Strathairn and John Sayles. Clapp also studied at The National Theater Institute at the Eugene O'Neill Theater Center (Fall 1970).

Career
Clapp has appeared in numerous TV shows such as Check it Out! and Night Court as well as numerous stage plays. His film credits include Return of the Secaucus 7 (1979), Running (1979), Matewan (1987), Eight Men Out (1988, as Chicago White Sox catcher Ray Schalk), Termini Station (1989), The Rage: Carrie 2 (1999), Rules of Engagement (2000), Sunshine State (2002), and Flags of Our Fathers (2006) as United States Marine Corps Gen. Holland Smith. He appeared in the Star Trek: Deep Space Nine episode "Vortex."
From 1993 to 2005, Clapp played Detective Greg Medavoy on "NYPD Blue." He won an Emmy for the role.

In 2007, he appeared as Coach Mad Maddox in The Game Plan. On Broadway, he most recently appeared in the revival of David Mamet's Pulitzer Prize-winning play Glengarry Glen Ross, where he was nominated for a Tony Award for Best Performance by a Featured Actor in a Play. He also played Alan Silver in episode Holiday Spirit in Ghost Whisperer (3x10).

In 1995, he played Father Paul in Her Hidden Truth. In 2007 Clapp voiced Horny The Clown in the horror film Drive-Thru. Later that year, Clapp also appeared as Det Dick Walenski in "In Name and Blood," season 3 episode 2 of Criminal Minds. Clapp portrayed a corrupt police officer in a 2008 episode of Cold Case. He played the main antagonist Gen. Peter Randall in the Prototype video game. Clapp plays the father of Ellen (Rose Byrne) in the F/X show Damages.

In 2014, Clapp began playing a recurring role as Chaplain Orlovsky in Chicago Fire.

In 2021 Clapp had a modest but critical role in the acclaimed HBO series Mare of Easttown, playing key witness Pat Ross.

Personal life
Clapp was previously married to actress Deborah Taylor from 1986 to 1999. He married Elisabeth Gordon, whom he met through a mutual friend, on November 5, 2016. They reside in both Vermont and Boston.

Filmography

Film

Television

References

External links
 

1948 births
Male actors from New Hampshire
American male film actors
American male television actors
South Kent School alumni
Living people
Outstanding Performance by a Supporting Actor in a Drama Series Primetime Emmy Award winners
Williams College alumni
People from North Conway, New Hampshire
Theatre World Award winners